Wilhelmine, Gräfin von Lichtenau, born as Wilhelmine Enke, also spelled Encke (29 December 1753 in Potsdam – 9 June 1820 in Berlin), was the official mistress of King Frederick William II of Prussia from 1769 until 1797 and was elevated by him into the nobility. She is regarded as politically active and influential in the policy of Prussia during his reign.

Biography
The future Countess von Lichetenau's father, Johann Elias Enke, was a chamber musician in service of King Frederick II of Prussia. Wilhelmine met Crown Prince Fredrick William in 1764. The king preferred that the crown prince maintain a relationship with her rather than have changing relationships with foreign women, and in 1769, during which for most of the year she was 15 and he 24, she became the crown prince's official mistress.

The couple had five children, of whom only the youngest survived to adulthood:

A daughter – born and died 10 August 1770).
Ulrike Sophie von Berckholz – March 1774 to 5 September 1774
Christina Sophie Frederica von Lützenberg 25–31 August 1777
Count Alexander von der Marck – 4 January 1779 to 1 August 1787 – reportedly the King's favorite child; he was probably poisoned
Countess Marianne Diderica Frederica Wilhelmine von der Marck – 29 February 1780 to 11 June 1814

Countess Marianne survived into adulthood. She married firstly, on 17 March 1797, Hereditary Count Frederick of Stolberg-Stolberg; they divorced in 1799.  Her second marriage on 14 March 1801 was to Baron Kaspar von Miaskowski; they were also subsequently divorced.  Her third and final marriage was in 1807 to French aristocrat Étienne de Thierry. She had four daughters over her three marriages, the eldest of them was the notorious poet Countess Louise of Stolberg-Stolberg.

In 1782, Fredrick William arranged for her to marry his councillor and chamberlain Johann Friedrich Rietz (1755–1809), but the relationship between Wilhelmine and Fredrick William continued.

It is debated whether Wilhelmine co-operated with Johann Rudolph von Bischoffswerder and Johann Christoph von Wöllner to keep the monarch under control. Wilhelmine was given the title Countess von Lichtenau in 1794, but this was not made public for two years, until 1796.

After Frederick William died in 1797, Wilhelmine was exiled and her property confiscated, although she was finally granted a pension in 1800. From 1802 to 1806, she had a second marriage to the dramatic Franz Ignaz von Holbein, known as "Fontano" and 26 years her junior, in Breslau (now in Poland and renamed Wrocław). In 1811, Napoleon allowed her to return to Berlin.

Legacy
Wilhelmine, known popularly as "Beautiful Wilhelmine", is closely associated with the Marmorpalais in Potsdam. As Friedrich Wilhelm II's official mistress, she had great influence on the interior decoration of the palace. Following plans by Michael Philipp Boumann, an early classicist style townhouse called Lichtenau Palace was erected for her at the edge of Potsdam's Neuer Garten, at a site on today's Behlertstrasse.

During her lifetime, she was the subject of satire, and following fake memoirs, she published her own. She is a main character in Ernst von Salomon's 1965 novel Die schöne Wilhelmine, which also was turned into a 1984 television serial Beautiful Wilhelmine.

See also
 Julie von Voß
 Sophie von Dönhoff

References

1753 births
1820 deaths
People from Potsdam
18th-century German people
Mistresses of German royalty